Abbão Dias Bartolomeu (born 15 March 1966) is an Angolan former judoka. He competed in the men's extra-lightweight event at the 1988 Summer Olympics.

References

External links
 

1966 births
Living people
Angolan male judoka
Olympic judoka of Angola
Judoka at the 1988 Summer Olympics
Place of birth missing (living people)
20th-century Angolan people
21st-century Angolan people